Eero Savilahti (born August 10, 1992) is a Finnish ice hockey player, who currently is with the Heilbronner Falken of the DEL2.

Savilahti made his Liiga debut playing with Ilves during the 2013–14 Liiga season. He went on to play 232 games for Ilves until he was released on May 2, 2019. In the 2019–20 season, he played for Kiekko-Vantaa and Kovee in the second Finnish league, Mestis, before leaving to play for the Heilbronner Falken.

References

External links

1992 births
Living people
Finnish ice hockey forwards
Ilves players
KOOVEE players
Lempäälän Kisa players
Nybro Vikings players
Ice hockey people from Tampere